Ferenc Esterházy de Galántha (1533–1604) was a Hungarian noble, who served as Vice-ispán (Viscount; vicecomes) of Pozsony County since 1579. He was the ancestor of the wealthy and prestigious House of Esterházy.

His parents were Benedek Zerhas de Zerhashaz (or Eszterhas), from the kindred of Salamon, and Ilona Bessenyei de Galántha. He was the first from his family who used the title of "Galántha" (galánthai) when he inherited the lordship of Galánta (today: Galanta, Slovakia) from his mother. Following his father's death in 1553, he built a Renaissance-style mansion in 1600. Another, Neo-Gothic castle situated in the town built by two of his sons, Dániel and Pál in 1633.

Ferenc participated in the 1596 campaign against the Ottoman Empire. He served in the army under commander Count Miklós Pálffy. His son, István was killed in the Battle of Keresztes on 26 October 1596.

Family
Ferenc Esterházy married to Zsófia Illésházy de Illésháza (1547–1599), sister of Palatine István Illésházy, in 1566. They had several children:

 Magdolna (26 January 1567 – 1 September 1616), married to László Kubinyi de Felsőkubin et Nagyolaszi (d. 1598)
 Ferenc I (b. 18 July 1568), died young
 Tamás (8 May 1570 – 1615 or 1616)
 István (4 March 1572 – 26 October 1596), died in the Battle of Keresztes
 János (b. 1574), died young
 Ferenc II (b. 1576), died young
 Farkas (1577 – 25 August 1643)
 Zsófia (29 October 1578 – 7 May 1620), married to Márton Révay de Riva et Trebosztó (1565–1630), who served as Vice-ispán of Turóc County
 Gábor (8 October 1580 – 28 December 1626), received the title of Baron in 1613

 Miklós (8 April 1583 – 11 September 1645), received the title of Baron in 1613, the title of Count in 1626, founder of the Fraknó branch, Palatine of Hungary (1625–1645), ancestor of the Princely House of Esterházy
 Dániel (26 July 1585 – 14 June 1654), received the title of Baron in 1613, founder of the Csesznek branch
 Pál (1 February 1587 – 17 January 1645), received the title of Baron in 1613, founder of the Zólyom branch
 Anna (22 May 1590 – 1638), married Count János Kéry de Kiskér, who served as Vice-ispán of Zólyom County

References

Sources

1533 births
1604 deaths
Ferenc
Hungarian nobility